André Barthélémy (16 June 1896, Dole, Jura – 31 January 1980) was a French politician. He represented the French Communist Party in the Constituent Assembly elected in 1945, Constituent Assembly elected in 1946 and in the National Assembly from 1946 to 1958. Later on he joined the Unified Socialist Party (PSU).

References

1896 births
1980 deaths
People from Dole, Jura
Politicians from Bourgogne-Franche-Comté
French Communist Party politicians
Unified Socialist Party (France) politicians
Members of the Constituent Assembly of France (1945)
Members of the Constituent Assembly of France (1946)
Deputies of the 1st National Assembly of the French Fourth Republic
Deputies of the 2nd National Assembly of the French Fourth Republic
Deputies of the 3rd National Assembly of the French Fourth Republic
French military personnel of World War I
Communist members of the French Resistance